Ali Haider Tabatabai (or Syed Ali Hyder Nazm Tabatabai) born 1854 in Awadh, died 1933 in Hyderabad Deccan, India, was a poet, translator and a scholar of languages. He descended from a long line of soldiers. He translated into Urdu Thomas Gray's "Elegy Written in a Country Churchyard".

References

1854 births
1933 deaths
English–Urdu translators
Urdu-language poets from India
Indian scholars